Lord High Commissioner is the style of High Commissioners, i.e. direct representatives of the monarch, in three cases in the Kingdom of Scotland and the United Kingdom, two of which are no longer extant. Consequently, the remaining office is often known in short simply as the Lord High Commissioner.

Ecclesiastic: Church of Scotland

The lord high commissioner to the General Assembly of the Church of Scotland is the British sovereign's personal representative to the General Assembly of the Church of Scotland (the Kirk), reflecting the latter's role as the national church of Scotland, and the Sovereign's role as a member of that Church.

Historical political offices

Scottish Parliament
See Lord High Commissioner to the Parliament of Scotland

Ionian Islands Protectorate
There were ten incumbents in 1815–1863, representing the British protecting power to the United States of the Ionian Islands as a federal Septinsular Republic of seven formerly Venetian (see Ionian Islands under Venetian rule) Ionian islands (Corfu, Cephalonia, Zante, Santa Maura, Ithaca, Cerigo and Paxos), officially a joint protectorate of the Allied Christian Powers, de facto a UK amical protectorate, as established under the 1815 Treaty of Paris.
The office ceased when the islands were integrated in independent Greece in 1864.

The incumbents were:
1815–1823: Sir Thomas Maitland 
1823–1832: Sir Frederick Adam
1832–1835: The Lord Nugent
1835–1840: Sir Howard Douglas
1840–1843: James Alexander Stewart Mackenzie
1843–1849: The Lord Seaton
1849–1855: Sir Henry George Ward
1855–1859: Sir John Young
1859–1863: Sir Henry Knight Storks

In addition, between November 1858 and March 1859, William Ewart Gladstone served as high commissioner extraordinary to determine the political future of the Ionian Islands. He recommended that the Ionian Islands remain under British protection.  However, when the Bavarian-born King of Greece, Otto I, was deposed and replaced by the Anglophile king George I, the Ionian Islands were ceded to Greece, ending the position of lord high commissioner.

See also
 The Queen and religion in the UK
 List of Moderators of the General Assembly of the Church of Scotland
 Order of precedence in Scotland
 Lord Lieutenant

Sources, references and external links
Church of Scotland website
WorldStatesmen – entry on Greece

Governance of the British Empire
Church of Scotland
Ecclesiastical titles
Gubernatorial titles
Political history of Scotland